The Placerville Mountain Democrat (known locally as the Mountain Democrat or simply Democrat) is the newspaper of El Dorado County, California, based in Placerville and is the oldest continuously published newspaper in the State of California.

History

1800s
The Mountain Democrat began as The Argus with first editorial published on November 19, 1853, by its publisher, D.W. Gelwicks. The Argus was housed in the Crescent City Building in Coloma, California, then the county seat. In February 1854, Gelwicks bought the El Dorado Republican from Thomas Springer of Placerville and combined the two as the Mountain Democrat. Its first issue date was  February 25, 1854. During the 1850s, the newspaper reported news from steamships as they docked in San Francisco, California, after travel around Cape Horn – "usually about six months old. But it was new news in the mines." In 1889, the Weekly Observer merged with the Mountain Democrat.

1900s

In 1922, the Mountain Democrat absorbed the Georgetown Gazette newspaper; in 1924,  Mountain Publishing Company formed as owner of the Mountain Democrat. In 1935, the Placerville Republican merged with the Mountain Democrat.  In 1958, the Placerville Times merged with the Mountain Democrat.

Organization

Current owner is McNaughton Newspapers, Inc.; current publisher is Richard Esposito and most recent editor Krysten Kellum.

See also
 List of the oldest newspapers

References

External links
 
 Archive

Weekly newspapers published in California
El Dorado County, California
1851 establishments in California